Brian Theodore "Ted" Erck (born February 14, 1961) is an American former professional tennis player.

Erck grew up in Houston and attended The Kinkaid School. He played collegiate tennis for the University of Texas, graduating with an economics degree in 1983.

While competing on the professional tour he made appearances in grand slam tournaments including the 1985 Australian Open, where he reached the round of 16 in men's doubles.

ATP Challenger finals

Doubles: 1 (0–1)

References

External links
 
 

1961 births
Living people
American male tennis players
Texas Longhorns men's tennis players
Tennis players from Houston
The Kinkaid School alumni